MySpace Records was a record label founded in 2005 to sign artists who appeared on the social networking site Myspace. It was a wholly owned subsidiary of Myspace, operating as a joint-venture between MySpace and Interscope Records.  Distribution is contracted to Universal Music Group's Fontana Distribution, with manufacturing and external marketing by Universal's Interscope.

MySpace Records operated as a record label located in Beverly Hills, California. The president was MySpace co-founder Tom Anderson, until he left the company in 2009. The company was shut down in December 2016.

Milestones
In March 2008 MySpace Records released Pennywise's ninth album, Reason to Believe. A partnership with corporate sponsor Textango meant that MySpace Records provided fans with a free download of the album during a two-week period, in exchange for adding the sponsor as a friend on MySpace.com.
In 2009 Jeremy Greene released his single "Rain" featuring Pitbull that became the #1 song on MySpace in its prime.

Former artists
Adventure Galley
Call the Cops
Kate Voegele
Meiko
Disco Curtis
Zendy Yunoki
Hollywood Undead
Jeremy Greene
Christina Milian
Mateo
Bossman 
Mickey Avalon
Nico Vega
Pennywise
Polysics
Sherwood
Dirt Nasty
Set To Fall
Tray

Compilations
MySpace Records Volume 1
 AFI — "Rabbits are Roadkill on Rt. 37"
 New Years Day — "Ready, Aim, Misfire"
 Socratic — "Lunch for the Sky"
 The Click Five — "Angel to You"
 Say Anything — "Every Man Has a Molly"
 Fall Out Boy — "Nobody Puts Baby in the Corner (Acoustic)"
 Dashboard Confessional — "Hands Down"
 Waking Ashland — "I Am for You"
 Weezer — "We Are All on Drugs"
 Hollywood Undead — "No. 5"
 Against Me! — "Don't Lose Touch"
 Tila Tequila — "Straight Up"
 The All-American Rejects — "Stab My Back"
 The Summer Obsession — "Melt the Sugar"
 Plain White T's — "Take Me Away"
 Copeland — "Pin Your Wings"
 Jupiter Sunrise — "Arthur Nix"

References

External links
MySpace Records on Myspace

Myspace
American record labels
Record labels established in 2005
Record labels disestablished in 2016